Fight Back, Fights Back or Fightback may refer to:

Music
Fight Back (Discharge EP), 1980, or the title song
Fight Back! (Oi Polloi album)
Fight Back! (Icy Demons album), a 2004 album by Icy Demons
"Fight Back", a 1972 song by Solomon Burke
"Fight Back", a 1994 song by Garnett Silk
"Fight Back", a 1996 song by The Exploited on Beat the Bastards
"Fight Back", a 2002 song by Frisco Kid on Riddim Driven: X5
"Fight Back", a 2004 song by 48May on The Mad Love
"Fight Back", a 2005 song by Raptile
"Fight Back", a 2010 song by Ron Wasserman
"Fight Back", a 2018 song by NEFFEX

Other uses
Fightback (video game)
Fightback! (policy), a 1990s economic policy of the Liberal Party of Australia
Fightback, the Canadian section of the International Marxist Tendency
Fight Back! with David Horowitz, a weekly consumer advocate show
Today, Goldhawk Fights Back, a daily radio show by Dale Goldhawk on CFZM

See also
Fighting Back (disambiguation)